Centro Financiero Gigante (CFG) is a complex of office buildings located in San Salvador, El Salvador. It has five towers: July 1, one 10, another 12, another 14 and the highest 19 floors, the tallest tower measures 70 meters (229.65  feet).

It is a phased project that began with the construction of the first two towers. After several years increased the number of buildings and has become one of the most buoyant complexes in San Salvador.
Distribution of the towers:

Details 

Tower "A" is home to the telephone company RED.

Tower "B" (the highest) is owned by the Spanish company Telefónica.

Tower "C" is owned by Tigo.

Tower "D" is occupied by the U.S. company Stream Global Services.

Tower "E" is the headquarters of Walmart in El Salvador.

There are several Call Centers and Nearshore Operations located in this complex, including Ubiquity Global Services and Tech Americas USA.  The Canadian and Israeli embassies are also located in the towers.

Buildings and structures in San Salvador
Skyscrapers in El Salvador
Buildings and structures completed in 1989
Skyscraper office buildings